Eric "Bibo" Bergeron (born July 14, 1965) is a French animator and film director. His work includes The Road to El Dorado (2000), Shark Tale (2004) and A Monster in Paris (2011).

Bergeron has served as animator on films like Asterix in Britain (1986), Asterix and the Big Fight (1989), Fievel Goes West (1991), FernGully: The Last Rainforest (1992), We're Back! A Dinosaur's Story (1993), All Dogs Go to Heaven 2 (1996), A Goofy Movie (1995), and The Adventures of Pinocchio (1996).

He also worked as storyboard artist on Sinbad: Legend of the Seven Seas (2003), The Madagascar Penguins in a Christmas Caper (2005) and Flushed Away (2006).

In 1993 Bergeron founded the animation studio "Bibo Films" in France. He directed the 2011 film A Monster in Paris which he dedicated to his father. Bergeron is an alumnus of the Gobelins School of the Image.

Filmography

References

External links
 
 

1965 births
Living people
20th-century births
French animators
French storyboard artists
French film directors
French animated film directors
DreamWorks Animation people
Walt Disney Animation Studios people